Héctor Cotto González (born August 8, 1984) is a Puerto Rican Olympic athlete specializing in the 110 meters hurdles.

Background 
Cotto was born in Fajardo, Puerto Rico. His family moved to Irondequoit, New York, where he attended East Ridge Senior High School. When his family moved to Cary, North Carolina, he attended Green Hope High School and graduated in 2002. 

At Green Hope High, Cotto played football, ran track and field, and earned several all-conference honors for track. His personal best for the 110 and 55 meter hurdles ranked him at 11th in the nation in 2002. As of 2015, Cotto still holds several Green Hope High School records in track.  

Cotto attended Fayetteville State University, but transferred to East Carolina University after one year. While at ECU, he broke  their records for the 60 and 110 meter hurdles.

Olympics 
After graduation from ECU, Cotto began his professional career representing Puerto Rico. He competed in the 110 meter hurdles in both the Beijing Olympics in 2008 and the London Olympics in 2012. He also competed in the World Athletics Championships in 2007, 2009, and 2011.

Competition record

Personal bests 
Cotto holds the Puerto Rican national record for 110m hurdles and the 60m hurdles. Of hurdling, he says, "Running is the easy part. To me it’s always been about the technique. The ultimate goal is to be so efficient over the hurdles that you can let loose and just run when you race. That’s when hurdling is fun. That’s what all the hard work is for.”

Outdoors 
100m 10.37 (+1.4 m/s) (Walnut 2010)
110m hurdles 13.49 (+1.6 m/s) (Guadalajara 2011)

Indoors 
60m hurdles 7.71 (Flagstaff 2014)

Awards and honors 
Cotto won the gold metal for 110m hurdles at the Ibero-American Championships in 2010, followed by the silver metal for 110m. hurdles in 2012. 

In 2015, Green Hope High School inducted Cotto into the first class of their Sports Hall of Fame.

Personal life 
As of 2015, Cotto coaches track & field at William G. Enloe High School in Raleigh, North Carolina. He also helps train other coaches through his online Hurdle Rhythm Training Series, training workshops, and The Hurdle Magazine.

References

External links
 

1984 births
Living people
Puerto Rican male hurdlers
Athletes (track and field) at the 2008 Summer Olympics
Athletes (track and field) at the 2012 Summer Olympics
Athletes (track and field) at the 2007 Pan American Games
Athletes (track and field) at the 2011 Pan American Games
Pan American Games competitors for Puerto Rico
Olympic track and field athletes of Puerto Rico
East Carolina University alumni
People from Fajardo, Puerto Rico
People from Cary, North Carolina
Central American and Caribbean Games bronze medalists for Puerto Rico
Competitors at the 2010 Central American and Caribbean Games
Central American and Caribbean Games medalists in athletics
21st-century Puerto Rican people